Oruza stragulata is a species of moth of the family Erebidae. It is found from Japan to Australia

References
(in German) Pagenstecher, 1899. Die Lepidopterenfauna des Bismarck-archipels. Zoologica Hft. 27-29.1-267. 2 pl.

External links
 images at boldsystems.org

Boletobiinae
Moths of Japan